William Grose (December 16, 1812 – July 30, 1900) was a lawyer, politician, author, and brigadier general in the Union Army during the American Civil War. He served in many of the important campaigns and battles of the Western Theater, earning a reputation for being "always seen where the bullets flew thickest."

Early life and career
Grose was born in Dayton, Ohio, to a family with strong military ties. His father had served in the United States Army under William Henry Harrison against the British Army in the War of 1812 and his grandfather Jacob Grose had been killed in the American Revolution. In the spring of 1813, Grose's family moved to Fayette County, Indiana, and then to Henry County in 1829. He worked as a youth as a farm laborer and in a local brickyard.

Grose studied law in New Castle, Indiana, where he lived the rest of his life. He passed the bar exam in 1842 and established a successful law practice and unsuccessfully ran for the United States Congress in 1852 as a Democrat. Switching political parties, in 1856 he was a delegate to the Republican National Convention, supporting John C. Fremont's unsuccessful candidacy for President of the United States. He was elected in 1860 as a judge of the local common pleas court.

Civil War
With the outbreak of the Civil War, Grose was appointed colonel of the 36th Indiana Infantry in October 1861, a regiment he recruited and trained. He led the regiment during the Battle of Shiloh, where his horse was shot from under him and he was slightly wounded in the shoulder. Shortly afterwards, he replaced the wounded Brig. Gen. Jacob Ammen in command of a brigade of infantry in the Army of the Cumberland under Maj. Gen. Don Carlos Buell. He participated in numerous campaigns and battles, including the pursuit of Braxton Bragg's army in the Kentucky Campaign, having another horse killed at the Battle of Stones River.

In 1863, he fought in the Tullahoma Campaign and the Battle of Chickamauga, where he was wounded in the neck. He and his men performed well during the Chattanooga Campaign in late 1863, taking part in the assault on Lookout Mountain and received praise in the official reports of the battle.

The following year, Grose led his brigade in the Atlanta Campaign under William T. Sherman. During the Siege of Atlanta in July 1864, he was commissioned a brigadier general of U.S. Volunteers. He commanded a brigade in Maj. Gen. Nathan Kimball's division in Maj. Gen. Thomas J. Wood's IV Corps. Grose accompanied the Army of the Tennessee northward in pursuit of John Bell Hood and fought in the Franklin-Nashville Campaign, where Hood's army was virtually destroyed. He was brevetted as a major general in August 1865, while serving on administrative duty on a court-martial of a fellow officer.

Postbellum
Following the war, Grose remained in the Regular Army for a year, and then resigned in January 1866. He returned to New Castle, Indiana, and resumed his law practice. President Andrew Johnson appointed him as the collector of internal revenue taxes for his region, a post he held until 1874.

Interested in social improvement, Grose took a position on the Indiana commission that oversaw the construction of mental hospitals. In 1878, he was narrowly defeated in a bid for a Congressional seat. In 1887, Grose returned to politics, successfully campaigning for a seat in the Indiana State Senate. In 1891, he authored the regimental history of the 36th Indiana Infantry and actively participated in its veterans reunions.

Grose died at the age of 87 in his home in New Castle, Indiana, and was buried in South Mound Cemetery.

The Gen. William Grose House in New Castle is the home of the Henry County Historical Society and open to the public.

See also

List of American Civil War generals (Union)

Notes

References
 Grose, William, The Story of the Marches, Battles and Incidents of the 36th Regiment Indiana Volunteer Infantry 
 Warner, Ezra J., Generals in Blue: Lives of the Union Commanders. Baton Rouge: Louisiana State University Press, 1964, .

External links

1812 births
1900 deaths
Politicians from Dayton, Ohio
Indiana lawyers
Union Army generals
People of Indiana in the American Civil War
Democratic Party Indiana state senators
People from New Castle, Indiana
19th-century American politicians
19th-century American lawyers